Selwyn George Carrol (October 31, 1928 – December 21, 2010) was an American politician who served as a member of the Alaska House of Representatives from 1972 to 1974.

Early life
Carrol was a native of Altamonte Springs, Florida. He was raised in Jacksonville and attended Stanton College Preparatory School. He moved to Alaska around 1958, while serving in the United States Army.

Career 
He settled in Fairbanks, Alaska, in 1966, and was a social worker affiliated with the Alaska Department of Public Welfare by August 1967, before joining the Alaska Department of Corrections as a supervisor of the youth detention center in the Alaska State Jail. Carrol was hired by the Fairbanks North Star Borough School District in May 1970 as an attendance officer, and later served the district as a middle school teacher.

Politics
Carrol won the Republican Party nomination for a seat on the Alaska House of Representatives during the 1970 election cycle, but lost in the general election. He was elected a state representative in the 1972 election. Upon taking office, Carrol became the first African American member of the Alaska Legislature to be affiliated with the Republican Party. In his single term on the Alaska House of Representatives, Carrol chaired the House Community and Regional Affairs Committee and was a member of the Labor and Management Committee. Carrol sought an Alaska Senate seat in 1974, finishing first in a Republican Party primary, though he lost a close three-way race to incumbent John Butrovich. Carrol's 1976 campaign for reelection to the state house reported no deficit in September 1976. He received $8,050 in total donations during the election cycle, and spent the same amount on his campaign. Expenditures included a fine of $10, assessed by the Alaska Public Offices Commission. Carrol finished tenth of twelve total candidates for the seat.

Carrol moved to Hampton County, South Carolina, in 1977, where he remained for the rest of his life and served as county auditor. Carrol died on December 21, 2010, and was buried at the Beaufort National Cemetery in Beaufort.

References

1928 births
2010 deaths
Burials at Beaufort National Cemetery
Republican Party members of the Alaska House of Representatives
African-American state legislators in Alaska
County officials in South Carolina
County auditors in the United States
South Carolina Republicans
Schoolteachers from Alaska
United States Army soldiers
20th-century American educators
African-American schoolteachers
Politicians from Fairbanks, Alaska
20th-century American politicians
People from Hampton County, South Carolina
Politicians from Jacksonville, Florida
People from Altamonte Springs, Florida
African-American people in South Carolina politics
American social workers
Military personnel from Florida
Military personnel from Alaska
20th-century African-American politicians
African-American men in politics
21st-century African-American people